Jose Baby (born 24 February 1959) is an Indian politician and leader of Communist Party of India. He was the Deputy Speaker of 12th KLA. He represented Mannarkkad constituency in 10th and 12th Kerala Legislative Assembly.

References

Communist Party of India politicians from Kerala
1959 births
Kerala MLAs 1996–2001
Kerala MLAs 2006–2011
Living people
Deputy Speakers of the Kerala Legislative Assembly